Leontyevka is a rural locality (a selo) in Krasnoyarovsky Selsoviet of Mazanovsky District, Amur Oblast, Russia. The population was 70 as of 2018. There are 2 streets.

Geography 
Leontyevka is located on the left bank of the Birma River, 38 km southwest of Novokiyevsky Uval (the district's administrative centre) by road. Antonovka is the nearest rural locality.

References 

Rural localities in Mazanovsky District